Red Deer Press is a Canadian book publishing company located in Leaside, Ontario. It publishes trade titles in children's fiction, literary fiction, poetry, drama, belles-lettres, and creative nonfiction focusing on the Canadian prairies.

Red Deer Press was founded in 1975 as a subsidiary of Red Deer College.  Red Deer Press operates as a Fitzhenry & Whiteside Company.

Red Deer books have won several awards over the years, including the 2009 Governor General's Award for Children's literature (text) for Caroline Pignat's Greener Grass: The Famine Years.

References

Further reading
 Boultbee, Paul G., "Vain Dream to Mainstream: The Growth of Red Deer College Press", Papers of The Bibliographical Society of Canada. 33(1):51-66, 1995.

External links
 

Book publishing companies of Canada
Publishing companies established in 1975
Companies based in Ontario
1975 establishments in Alberta